CSI: NY is a CBS police procedural drama series created as second spin-off of CSI: Crime Scene Investigation. This edition follows a New York City forensics team headed by Det. Mac Taylor. The series ran from September 22, 2004, to February 22, 2013. Over the nine seasons, a total of 197 original episodes of CSI: NY were aired.

Series overview

Episodes

Pilot—CSI: Miami

Season 1 (2004–05)

Season 2 (2005–06)

Season 3 (2006–07)

Season 4 (2007–08)

Season 5 (2008–09)

Season 6 (2009–10)

Season 7 (2010–11)

Season 8 (2011–12)

Season 9 (2012–13)

Ratings

Home video releases 

Note: In region 1 the pilot episode, "MIA/NYC NonStop", is included in the CSI: NY season 1 DVD set and all crossover episodes from seasons 6 and 9 are included in their seasons. Season 2's CSI: Miami crossover ("Felony Flight") is not included in its DVD set.

References

External links

CSI: NY episodes on Internet Movie Database
CSI: NY episodes on CSI Files
CSI: New York on The Futon Critic

List of CSI: NY episodes
Lists of American crime drama television series episodes
Television episodes set in New York City